Wolmyeong Baseball Stadium is a baseball stadium in Gunsan, South Korea.

See also
 Wolmyeong Sports Complex

Gunsan
Baseball venues in South Korea
Sports venues in North Jeolla Province
Kia Tigers
1989 establishments in South Korea
Sports venues completed in 1989
20th-century architecture in South Korea